Mary Essiful  (born 22 June 1993) is a Ghanaian footballer who plays as a midfielder for the Ghana women's national football team. She was part of the team at the 2014 African Women's Championship. On club level she played for Soccer Intellectuals Ladies in Ghana. In 2020, she signed for NWFL Premiership side, Rivers Angels F.C.

References

1993 births
Living people
Ghanaian women's footballers
Ghana women's international footballers
Place of birth missing (living people)
Women's association football midfielders
Rivers Angels F.C. players
Expatriate footballers in Nigeria Women Premier League